Villa Grande may refer to:
 Villa Grande, a property on Bygdøy in Oslo
 Villa Grande, California, an unincorporated community in Sonoma County, California, United States
 Villa Grande, a property on the Via Appia Antica, in Rome. Bought in 1972, the villa hosted Valentino and Franco Zeffirelli.

See also
 Villa (disambiguation)
 Grande (disambiguation)